Woodville may refer to one of the following:

Places

Australia
Woodville, New South Wales
Woodville, South Australia, a suburb of Adelaide
Woodville railway station, Adelaide

Canada
Woodville, Ontario
Woodville, Nova Scotia

New Zealand
Woodville, New Zealand
Woodville (New Zealand electorate), a former parliamentary electorate, 1887–1890

United Kingdom
Woodville, Derbyshire, England

United States
Woodville, Alabama
Woodville, California
Dogtown, Marin County, California, formerly Woodville
Woodleaf, Yuba County, California, formerly Woodville
Woodville, Florida Largest municipality with this name
Woodville, Georgia
Woodville (Milledgeville, Georgia), listed on the NRHP in Georgia
Woodville (Winfield, Georgia), listed on the NRHP in Georgia
Woodville, Idaho
Woodville, Henry County, Indiana
Woodville, Porter County, Indiana
Woodville, Kentucky
Woodville, Maine
Woodville Township, Waseca County, Minnesota
Woodville, Mississippi
Woodville Historic District (Woodville, Mississippi), listed on the NRHP in Mississippi
Woodville, Missouri
Woodville, New York (disambiguation)
Woodhaven, Queens, New York, formerly Woodville
Woodville, Jefferson County, New York
Woodville, Ontario County, New York
Woodville, North Carolina (disambiguation)
Woodville, Bertie County, North Carolina
Woodville, Cherokee County, North Carolina
Woodville, Perquimans County, North Carolina
Woodville, Surry County, North Carolina
Lewiston Woodville, North Carolina
Woodville Historic District (Lewiston Woodville, North Carolina), listed on the NRHP in North Carolina
Woodville, Ohio, a village in Sandusky County
Woodville, Clermont County, Ohio
Woodville, Oklahoma
Woodville (Heidelberg, Pennsylvania), a house that is a National Historic Landmark
Woodville, Tennessee
Woodville, Texas
Woodville, Virginia
Woodville, Wisconsin, a village in St. Croix County, Wisconsin
Woodville, Calumet County, Wisconsin, a town

People
Woodville (surname)

See also
Woodsville (disambiguation)
Woodville Historic District (disambiguation)
Woodville School (disambiguation)
Woodville Township (disambiguation)